The Italian city of Milan is one of the most-visited tourist destinations in the European Union, with 8.81 million visitors in 2017, putting it 15th in the world when ranked by tourist visits. One source has 56% of international visitors to Milan are from Europe, 44% of the city's tourists are Italian, and 56% are from abroad. The most important European Union markets are the United Kingdom (16%), Germany (9%) and France (6%).

Tourism and statistics

According to a study, most of the visitors who come from the United States to the city go on business matters, while Chinese and Japanese tourists mainly take up the leisure segment. The city boasts several popular tourist attractions, such as the city's Duomo and Piazza, the Teatro alla Scala, the San Siro Stadium, the Galleria Vittorio Emanuele II, the Castello Sforzesco, the Pinacoteca di Brera and the Via Montenapoleone. Most tourists visit sights such as Milan Cathedral, the Castello Sforzesco and the Teatro alla Scala, however, other main sights such as the Basilica di Sant'Ambrogio, the Navigli and the Brera district are less visited and prove to be less popular. Milan is one of the most overlooked Italian destinations, often ranking fourth or fifth on most lists of desirable Italian cities for travelers.

Results from the same study also say that 60% of tourists who visit Milan are male, while 40% are female. Over 58% of visitors travel by air, and 26% by car.

Visitors to Milan appreciate it for different reasons; for example, 65% of visitors say that public transport is efficient, while 35% say that it is expensive and inadequate. Usually, tourists find that Milan has good entertainment and cultural opportunities (i.e. shopping, cuisine, music, nightlife and the arts) and that leisure activities are organized well and to a professional level. Overall, the average tourist visiting Milan is satisfied by the city; over 63% say it was as they expected, 80% would want to return and 74% would advise a friend to go. They also find that taxis are efficient and easy to find and that communication (i.e. advertising events and attractions) is good. However, many say that there is not enough green space, that the city is very expensive and that the average level of English, as of 2009, is not very high.

The number of international tourists has been steadily increasing, and as of 2015 there were around 3.21 million international arrivals.

Museums in Milan 

Milan has a plethora of museums, ranging from science and industry to antiquities and art. Below is a list of the main museums and permanent exhibitions in the city.

 Pinacoteca di Brera, a public gallery of art set up in the 1700s hosting works by Francesco Hayez, Andrea Mantegna, Caravaggio, Anthony van Dyck, titian, Donato Bramante and Piero della Francesca.
Museo del Novecento, a museum created in 2010 with a collection of paintings and sculptures from the first half of the 20th century. Its collection has works by italian futurists such as Umberto Boccioni, Giorgio de Chirico, Fortunato Depero. It also has works by foreign artists such as Paul Klee, Wassily Kandinsky, Pablo Picasso and Henri Matisse.
 Museo Civico di Storia Naturale di Milano, a museum of natural history. It boasts a whole sperm whale skeleton and a vast collection of dioramas. 
 Sforza Castle museums, which are around 6 different museums, there being the Ancient Egyptian section of the civico museo archeologico di milano, the "Achille Bertarelli" collection of prints, Museo d'Arte Antica, museo delle arti decorative, The pietà rondanini museum by Michelangelo, Pinacoteca castello Sforzesco and others.
Mudec, "the museum of cultures", a space hosting a permanent exhibition of artefacts from different cultures and many temporary exhibitions, such as one on Roy Lichtenstein during the summer of 2019

Hotels and restaurants

The city also has numerous hotels, including luxurious such as Principe di Savoia and the 7 star Town House Galleria. The average stay for a tourist in the city is of 3.43 nights, while foreigners stay for longer periods of time, 77% of which stay for a 2-5 night average. Of the 75% of visitors who stay in hotels, 4-star ones are the most popular (47%), while the ones which have 5-stars, or less than 3-stars represent 11% and 15% of the charts respectively. Visitors to the city, by average, find that accommodation is good, high-quality and that service is professional, however that it is also very expensive.

In addition to a unique cuisine, Milan has several world-renowned restaurants and cafés. Most of the more refined and upper-class restaurants are found in the historic centre, while the more traditional and popular ones are mainly located in the Brera and Navigli districts. Today, there is also a Nobu Japanese restaurant in Milan, which is located in Armani World in Via Manzoni and is regarded as being one of the trendiest restaurants in the city. One of the city's chicest cafés or pasticcerie is the Caffè Cova, an ancient Milanese coffeehouse founded in 1817 near the Teatro alla Scala, which has also opened franchises in Hong Kong. The Biffi Caffè and the Zucca in Galleria are also famous and historical ‘Caffès’ which are situated in Milan. Other restaurants in Milan include the Hotel Four Seasons restaurant, ‘La Briciola’, the Marino alla Scala and the Chandelier. Today, there are some new boutique-cafés, such as the Just Cavalli Café, owned by the luxury fashion goods brand Roberto Cavalli and the Armani Café in via Manzoni, owned by the homonymous fashion entrepreneur Giorgio Armani.

References

 
 
Metropolitan City of Milan
Economy of Milan